Shiva Mahbobi (Persian: شیوا محبوبی ) (born 1968) is an Iranian political activist currently residing in the United Kingdom. She is best known as the spokesperson of Campaign to Free Political Prisoners in Iran CFPPI and has campaigned to establish the 20th of June as an International day of action to support political prisoners in Iran. The 20th of June campaign has attracted the attention of international organisations such as the European Parliament, the EU parliament, and the governments of different EU countries.

Mahbobi was appointed as the coordinator and the spokesperson of the Campaign to Free Political Prisoners in Iran (CFPPI) in 2010. CFPPI is a non-profit organisation which was initially established in 2006 by a group of Iranian ex-political prisoners. Mahbobi is also the producer and presenter of a Persian Television program called 'For Political prisoners' which focuses on the situation of Iranian political prisoners and is broadcast fortnightly to Iran and Europe.

Shiva Mahbobi is a known figure for her works to improve the situation of political prisoners in Iran. Shiva's biography is featured in Death of Neda Agha-Soltan For A Free Iran. Mahbobi was invited, as one of the panelists, to participate in the Global Dialogue on the Future of Iran organised by the Department of Foreign affairs and International Trade and University of Toronto in Canada in May 2013. This conference was inaugurated by Munk School of Global Affairs. Mahbobi has Also appeared in various English Language as well as Persian language radio and television stations in the UK and the United States such as the BBC television series The Big Questions, Aljazeera English Television, BBC Persian Television, Voice of America Persian Television and Nahade Mardomi Persian Television in Los Angeles to name a few.

Life 

Mahbobi was a women's rights and students’ rights activist in Iran, which was deemed by the Islamic regime as ‘being the enemy of God’, and therefore she was arrested, tortured and imprisoned for more than three years at the age of 16. She continued her political activities after being released from prison, but had to leave the country for fear of being arrested and executed. She traveled to Turkey, where she sought asylum, and lived for more than two years before moving to Canada in 1994 and then to the UK in late 2001.

Mahbobi, while in Turkey, was member of the executive committee of the International Federation of Iranian Refugees and an activist of the International Campaign in Defense of Women's Rights in Iran. Mahbobi left Turkey to live in Canada where she worked as the coordinator of the Action Committee in Defense of Women's Rights in Iran (ACWRI) where she was actively engaged in raising awareness of the situation of Iranian women with international organisations such as Amnesty International. Mahbobi was one of the main organisers of the International Women's Day in Toronto, Canada in March 2001.

Following her move to the UK, Mahbobi took up a role as the public relations officer of the International Committee Against Stoning (ICAS). The ICAS lead an active campaign against the stoning of women all around the world. Mahbobi is also a women's rights activist and a member of the executive committee of the Equal Rights Now which is an Organisation against Women's Discrimination in Iran.

See also
 Munk School of Global Affairs
 The Big Questions
 Al Jazeera
 Death of Neda Agha-Soltan

References

Iranian activists
Living people
1968 births